Julia is a 1974 erotic drama film from West Germany starring Sylvia Kristel.

It was released in France in 1975 and recorded admissions of 403,892. It is also known as Summer Girl.

Production
The film was shot in the summer of 1974, in Verona, and on Lake Wörthersee, Austria and released on 1974-11-28.

German title 
The German title "It Was Not the Nightingale" is a allusion to Shakespeares Romeo and Juliet, Act 3, Scene 5, "JULIET: Wilt thou be gone? It is not yet near day. It was the nightingale, and not the lark, That pierced the fearful hollow of thine ear."

Sylvia Kristel recreates the balcony scene, during the visit to Verona.

References

External links 
 
https://www2.bfi.org.uk/films-tv-people/4ce2b6bd32cf2
https://www.filmportal.de/en/movie/es-war-nicht-die-nachtigall_ea43d4a72e715006e03053d50b37753d
https://www.allmovie.com/movie/v158968

1974 films
1970s erotic drama films
German erotic drama films
West German films
1970s German-language films
Films directed by Sigi Rothemund
Teensploitation
1974 drama films
1970s German films